Petar Bočkaj (born 23 July 1996) is a Croatian footballer who plays as a midfielder for Prva HNL club Dinamo Zagreb.

Club career
Having passed through the ranks of the GNK Dinamo Zagreb youth academy, Bočkaj spent his first two professional seasons with NK Inter Zaprešić and NK Lokomotiva in the Croatian First Football League. In June 2017, he transferred to NK Osijek, together with his teammate Eros Grezda.

International career
On 23 March 2017, Bočkaj made his debut for Croatia U21 in a friendly match against Slovenia.

Career statistics

Club

References

External links

1996 births
Living people
Footballers from Zagreb
Association football midfielders
Croatian footballers
Croatia youth international footballers
Croatia under-21 international footballers
NK Maksimir players
NK Inter Zaprešić players
NK Lokomotiva Zagreb players
NK Osijek players
Croatian Football League players